Parapsettus panamensis, the Panama spadefish, is a species of spadefish native to the Pacific coast of the Americas from the Gulf of California to Peru.  This species grows to a length of  TL though most do not exceed  TL.  This species is the only known member of its genus.

References

External links
 Photograph

Ephippidae
Taxa named by Franz Steindachner
Fish described in 1876